Ali Annabi (born 6 November 1939) is a Tunisian fencer. He competed in the individual sabre and épée events at the 1960 Summer Olympics.

References

External links
 

1939 births
Living people
Tunisian male sabre fencers
Olympic fencers of Tunisia
Fencers at the 1960 Summer Olympics
Fencers from Berlin
Tunisian male épée fencers
20th-century Tunisian people